Crispian Steele-Perkins (born 18 December 1944) is an internationally acclaimed classical trumpeter who was educated at Copthorne Preparatory School, Marlborough College and the Guildhall School of Music.

Personal life
Steele-Perkins lives in Dorking, Surrey and is the father of Emma, Kate and Guy. He is also grandfather to William and Ben Mitchell and Isabelle and Zoe Jinadu. In 1967, he married Angela Helen Hall (d. 1991), and in 1995 he married Jane Elizabeth Mary Steele-Perkins.

Career
Steele-Perkins picked up his first trumpet at the age of ten and progressed so quickly that just 6 years later he was playing with the English National Youth Orchestra. On graduating from the Guildhall School of Music, Steele-Perkins began his professional career with the Sadler's Wells Theatre (ENO) 1966–73, before performing with the London Gabrielli Brass Ensemble 1974–84, Royal Philharmonic Orchestra 1976–80, English Baroque Soloists 1980–91, Amsterdam Baroque Orchestra, The King's Consort, 1985–2009.
Steele-Perkins's purity of tone and artistic subtlety have received critical acclaim for more than four decades now. Throughout the 1980s and 1990s, he played a key role in the growth of historically-aware trumpet playing, using a collection of more than 100 pre-1900 mechanised and 'natural' trumpets to bring a brighter, clearer sound to baroque performances. In 2004, Steele-Perkins received the Monk Award for his significant and lifelong contribution to the field of early brass music.
In October 2015 BBC’s CD Choice programme selected his recording of Joseph Haydn’s Trumpet Concerto in Eb with the English Chamber Orchestra as the best available recording of the work.

In addition to his work with classical orchestras and period instruments, Steele-Perkins has developed a body of television and film work which is universally recognisable today – most famously he played the theme tune to the popular British television programme Antiques Roadshow. As a studio musician he also played for many film scores including Wild Geese, Zulu Dawn, Watership Down and Jaws 2 in 1978, The Life of Brian, Moonraker in 1979, Superman 2 in 1980, History of the World, Part 1, For Your Eyes Only, Arthur in 1981, Gandhi and Rambo in 1982, Never Say Never, Octopussy in 1983, Supergirl in 1984, Santa Claus, A View to Kill in 1985 and Robocop in 1988. Thereafter he became established as an international solo performer upon the Baroque Trumpet and toured the globe extensively.

Steele-Perkins has also accompanied some of the world's greatest singers, recording Handel's "Let the bright Seraphim" with Dame Kiri Te Kanawa and "Eternal Source of Light Divine" with James Bowman and Elin Manahan-Thomas. His more recent performances alongside Emma Kirkby, Lynn Dawson, Carolyn Sampson, Bryn Terfel and Lesley Garrett have cemented his international reputation as one of classical music's great ambassadors.

Well known for his enthusiasm and wit, Steele-Perkins is also a popular presenter giving recitals, lectures and masterclasses at schools, colleges and music venues around the world. He has a sizeable collection of antique trumpets from the late 18th century to 1920s and in later years has become an enthusiastic motorcyclist.

Selected recordings
Eternal Source of Light Divine, with James Bowman and The King's Consort, Purcell, Hyperion Records CDA66315
Classical Trumpet Concertos, with The King's Consort, Hyperion Records (2001) CDA67266
The Well-Tempered Trumpet, with Leslie Pearson, LDR Recordings (1989) LDRCD 1006
Music for Trumpet & Orchestra, Tafelmusik and Jeane Lamon, Sony Classical Records (1993) SK 53 365
Let The Trumpet Sound, with the Bournemouth Sinfonietta, Carlton Classics (1996) 30366 00382
The Regents Bugle, with Ian Partridge, Leslie Pearson and David Woodcock, Independent
Let The Bright Seraphim, with Jeni Bern and The Handel Players, Carlton Classics (1998) 30366 01182
Trumpets Ancient and Modern, with David Hill, Herald AV Publications (2000) HAVPCD 251
Trumpet Concertos, with the English Chamber Orchestra, Alto (1986) ALTO 1063
The Music of Gershwin, with Leslie Pearson, Independent (2007)

References

Who's Who 2006, Publ: A&C Black Ltd., London, p. 2136, 
Crispian Steele-Perkins in Conversation with Bruce Duffie, 2001, website. Retrieved 1 June 2009
Interview with Crispian Steele-Perkins, 2002, GFHandel.org. Retrieved 1 June 2009

Awards
Historic Brass Society – Christopher Monk Award, 2004, website. Retrieved 4 November 2010

Published works
Trumpet (Yehudi Menuhin Music Guides), Publ: Kahn & Averill, 2006,

External links
Crispian Steele-Perkins Homepage
Thaxted Music Festival

1944 births
Living people
English classical trumpeters
Male trumpeters
People educated at Copthorne Preparatory School
People from Dorking
21st-century trumpeters
21st-century British male musicians